Squadron is a British television series produced by the BBC in 1982.

The series dealt with the adventures of the fictional 370 Rapid Deployment Squadron of the Royal Air Force. The Squadron operated a mix of operational RAF aircraft including the Harrier GR Mk 3, Hercules C Mk 1, Puma HC Mk 1 and the first episode, Phantom FGR Mk 2. One series of ten episodes was made. The leading cast members included Michael Culver, Malcolm Stoddard, Derek Anders, and Catriona MacColl.

Credits

Regular Cast

Michael Culver – Group Captain James Christie
Malcolm Stoddard – Wing Commander Peter Tyson
Alan Hunter – Squadron Leader Mike Fairchild
Derek Anders – Squadron Leader Dave Grayson
Richard Simpson – Group Captain Harry Hall
Carl Rigg – Squadron Leader Clive Adams
Catriona MacColl – Flight Lieutenant Dr. Susan Young

Crew
 Producer: Joe Waters
 Theme music: Anthony Isaac
 Script Editor: Mervyn Haisman

Episodes

External links
 
 Action TV (sitedown) (Wayback machine mirror)

BBC television dramas
British military television series
Aviation television series
1980s British drama television series
1982 British television series debuts
1982 British television series endings
English-language television shows
Films set in England